Satoshi Kobayashi is a Japanese Muay Thai fighter and kickboxer, fighting out of Tokyo, Japan.

Titles and accomplishments

1996 NJKF Lightweight Champion
1998 Kick Union Lightweight Champion
2000 AJKF Lightweight Champion
2000 WKA Muay Thai World Lightweight Champion
 2000 WPKC Muay Thai World Lightweight Champion

Kickboxing record

|-  bgcolor="#fbb"
| 2006-11-12|| Loss ||align=left| Jaroenchai Jor Rachadakon || AJKF Solid Fist || Tokyo, Japan || Decision (Unanimous) || 5 ||3:00
|-  bgcolor="#cfc"
| 2006-06-11 || Win ||align=left| Yodkunklai Nongkamgym|| AJKF Triumph || Tokyo, Japan || KO (Left Hook to the Body) || 1 || 2:20
|-  bgcolor="#fbb"
| 2006-03-19 || Loss ||align=left| Yodkunklai Nongkamgym|| AJKF SWORD FIGHT 2006 || Tokyo, Japan || TKO (Doctor Stoppage) || 2 || 0:28
|-  bgcolor="#cfc"
| 2005-12-05 || Win ||align=left| Rittidet Wor.Surapon || AJKF Fujiwara Festival 2005 || Tokyo, Japan || TKO (3 Knockdowns) || 3 || 2:57
|-  style="background:#cfc;"
| 2005-09-16 || Win||align=left| Matthew Johnston|| AJKF STACK OF ARMS || Tokyo, Japan || KO (Right Hook) || 2 || 1:15
|-  style="background:#cfc;"
| 2005-07-24 || Win||align=left| David Lee Hoy|| AJKF SUPER FIGHT Japan VS World ・5vs5 || Tokyo, Japan || TKO (Corner Stoppage) || 3 || 1:45
|-  style="background:#cfc;"
| 2005-04-17 || Win||align=left| Jonathan Zarbo|| AJKF NEVER GIVE UP || Tokyo, Japan || KO (3 Knockdowns/Left Body Hook) || 1 || 1:32
|-  bgcolor="#fbb"
| 2005-01-04 || Loss||align=left| Haruaki Otsuki || AJKF Survivor || Tokyo, Japan || KO (Punches)|| 3 || 2:31
|-
! style=background:white colspan=9 |
|-  bgcolor="#fbb"
| 2004-11-27 || Loss ||align=left| Sak Kaoponlek ||  || Italy || TKO (Doctor Stoppage) || 2 ||
|-  style="background:#cfc;"
| 2004-08-22 || Win||align=left| Andy Donaldson|| AJKF SUPER FIGHT -LIGHTNING- || Tokyo, Japan || KO (Low Kick) || 4 || 2:20
|-  bgcolor="#fbb"
| 2004-04-16|| Loss|| align=left| Satoruvashicoba || AJKF, Lightweight Tournament 2004 2nd.STAGE  || Tokyo, Japan || Decision (Unanimous) || 3 || 3:00
|-  bgcolor="#cfc"
| 2004-02-25|| Win|| align=left| Kim Song Sub || AJKF DOG FIGHT! || Tokyo, Japan || KO || 2 || 2:03
|-  bgcolor="#cfc"
| 2003-11-23|| Win|| align=left| Koji Yoshimoto || AJKF SCRAMBLE  || Tokyo, Japan || Decision (Unanimous) || 3 || 3:00
|-  bgcolor="#fbb"
| 2003-05-23|| Loss|| align=left| Tsogto Amara || AJKF, Lightweight Tournament Semi Final  || Tokyo, Japan || Decision (Majority) || 3 || 3:00
|-  bgcolor="#fbb"
| 2003-03-08|| Loss|| align=left| Lim Chi-bin || AJKF, Lightweight Tournament Quarter Final || Tokyo, Japan || KO || 2 || 1:53
|-  style="background:#fbb;"
| 2002-12-14 || Loss ||align=left| Buakaw Banchamek || D4D Toyota Cup, Final Lumpinee Stadium || Bangkok, Thailand || Decision (Unanimous) || 3 || 3:00
|-
! style=background:white colspan=9 |
|-  style="background:#cfc;"
| 2002-12-14 || Win||align=left| Timo || D4D Toyota Cup, Semi Final Lumpinee Stadium || Bangkok, Thailand || KO (Low Kick) || 2 || 0:33
|-  style="background:#cfc;"
| 2002-12-14 || Win||align=left| Elvis || D4D Toyota Cup, Quarter Final Lumpinee Stadium || Bangkok, Thailand || KO (Knee) || 1 || 2:09
|-  bgcolor="#cfc"
| 2002-11-17 || Win ||align=left| Roberto Pasiri || AJKF BACK FROM HELL-I || Tokyo, Japan || KO (Knee)|| 2 || 2:03
|-  bgcolor="#fbb"
| 2002-09-06 || Loss ||align=left| Samkor Kiatmontep || A.J.K.F. GOLDEN TRIGGER || Tokyo, Japan || KO (Low Kicks) || 3 || 2:10
|-  bgcolor="#cfc"
| 2002-07-21 || Win ||align=left| Joseph Pulic|| AJKF CRUSH! || Tokyo, Japan || KO|| 3 || 0:35
|-
! style=background:white colspan=9 |
|-  bgcolor="#fbb"
| 2002-03-17 || Loss ||align=left| Namsaknoi Yudthagarngamtorn || A.J.K.F. "OVER the EDGE" || Tokyo, Japan || TKO(Referee Stoppage) || 2 || 2:19
|-  bgcolor="#cfc"
| 2002-01-04|| Win|| align=left| Hisayuki Kanazawa || AJKF KICK MIND  || Tokyo, Japan || Decision (Unanimous) || 5 || 3:00
|-  bgcolor="#cfc"
| 2001-11-30 || Win ||align=left| Osman Yigin|| AJKF LIGHT ON! || Tokyo, Japan || KO (Right Hook)|| 1 || 1:24
|-  bgcolor="#cfc"
| 2001-09-07 || Win ||align=left| Tepparit Por.Tawatchai || AJKF REVOLVER || Tokyo, Japan || KO (Punches) || 4 || 2:01
|-  bgcolor="#cfc"
| 2001-07-22 || Win ||align=left| Marshall Elizabeth|| AJKF BLAZE UP || Tokyo, Japan || KO || 2 || 2:50
|-  bgcolor="#cfc"
| 2001-06-10 || Win ||align=left| Rurawee Sarawite || AJKF KICKBOXING "DOG FIGHT" || Tokyo, Japan || KO || 2 || 1:57
|-  bgcolor="#cfc"
| 2001-05-17 || Win ||align=left| Jean-Charles Skarbowsky || AJKF JUST BRING IT! || Tokyo, Japan || KO (Punches)|| 2 || 1:31
|-  bgcolor="#fbb"
| 2001-03-16|| Loss|| align=left| Saddam Kietyongyuth || AJKF CROSS FIRE-I  || Tokyo, Japan || Decision (Unanimous)|| 5 || 3:00
|-  bgcolor="#cfc"
| 2000-12-09|| Win|| align=left| Andre Roncci || AJKF THE CHAMPIONSHIP  || Tokyo, Japan || Decision (Unanimous)|| 5 || 3:00
|-
! style=background:white colspan=9 |
|-  bgcolor="#cfc"
| 2000-12-09|| Win|| align=left| Marco Costaguta||   || Pordenone, Italy || Decision (Unanimous)|| 5 || 3:00
|-
! style=background:white colspan=9 |
|-  bgcolor="#cfc"
| 2000-11-29|| Win|| align=left| Daniel Hatch|| AJKF LEGEND-X  || Tokyo, Japan || KO (Left Hook)|| 2 || 1:03
|-  bgcolor="#cfc"
| 2000-10-22|| Win|| align=left| Christophe Leveque|| AJKF LEGEND-IX  || Tokyo, Japan || Decision (Unanimous)|| 5 || 3:00
|-  bgcolor="#cfc"
| 2000-07-30|| Win|| align=left| Marco Costaguta|| AJKF LEGEND-VIII  || Tokyo, Japan || KO (Knee) || 4 || 3:00
|-
! style=background:white colspan=9 |
|-  bgcolor="#cfc"
| 2000-06-20|| Win|| align=left| Kazuya Asuka|| AJKF LEGEND-VI  || Tokyo, Japan || KO (Low Kick) || 1 || 1:58
|-  bgcolor="#c5d2ea"
| 2000-05-24|| Draw|| align=left| David Gahan || AJKF LEGEND-V  || Tokyo, Japan || Decision || 5 || 3:00
|-  bgcolor="#cfc"
| 2000-03-16|| Win|| align=left| Mohammed Yamani || AJKF LEGEND-III  || Tokyo, Japan || KO (Left Hook) || 1 || 2:07
|-  bgcolor="#cfc"
| 2000-01-21|| Win|| align=left| Hisayuki Kanazawa || AJKF LEGEND-I  || Tokyo, Japan || Decision (Unanimous) || 5 || 3:00
|-
! style=background:white colspan=9 |
|-  bgcolor="#cfc"
| 1999-11-22|| Win|| align=left| Yoshiyuki Igarashi || AJKF WAVE-XIII  || Tokyo, Japan || KO || 3 || 2:23
|-  bgcolor="#cfc"
| 1999-09-03|| Win|| align=left| Ao Hayashi || AJKF  || Tokyo, Japan || KO || 2 ||
|-  bgcolor="#fbb"
| 1999-07-13|| Loss|| align=left| Yoshiyuki Igarashi || AJKF  || Tokyo, Japan || Decision (Unanimous) || 5 || 3:00
|-  bgcolor="#cfc"
| 1999-06-18|| Win|| align=left| Kenichi Sato|| MA Japan Kick  || Tokyo, Japan || TKO || 2 ||
|-  bgcolor="#cfc"
| 1999-04-29|| Win|| align=left| Yodlak Sor.Jitpattana || Kick Union || Tokyo, Japan || TKO || 5 ||
|-  bgcolor="#fbb"
| 1999-01-22|| Loss|| align=left| Chanapek Gatchyindee|| Kick Union || Tokyo, Japan || TKO || 3 ||
|-  bgcolor="#cfc"
| 1998-11-14|| Win|| align=left| Tomohiro Hoka || Shootboxing Ground Zero Tokyo || Tokyo, Japan || Decision (Unanimous) || 5 || 3:00
|-  bgcolor="#cfc"
| 1998-10-25|| Win|| align=left| Katsuhiro Ise || Kickboxing Champions All Stars || Japan || KO || 2 || 0:55
|-  bgcolor="#cfc"
| 1998-09-22|| Win|| align=left| Nobimitsu Sudo|| Kick Union || Japan || KO || 2 || 0:55 
|-
! style=background:white colspan=9 |
|-  bgcolor="#cfc"
| 1998-07-24|| Win|| align=left| Dias || Kick Union || Tokyo, Japan || TKO || 2 ||
|-  bgcolor="#fbb"
| 1998-04-12|| Loss || align=left| Oktay Ozkan || NKBB & MTBN Mjiro Gym KO POWER tournament || Netherlands || Decision (Unanimous) || 5 || 3:00
|-  bgcolor="#cfc"
| 1997-09-28|| Win|| align=left| Hisayuki Kanazawa || AJKF || Tokyo, Japan || KO || 4 ||
|-  bgcolor="#cfc"
| 1997-04-06|| Win|| align=left| Somchai Takatsu|| NJKF Beginning of Truth Part 5 || Tokyo, Japan || Decision (Unanimous) || 3 || 2:31 
|-
! style=background:white colspan=9 |
|-  bgcolor="#fbb"
| 1997-01-19|| Loss || align=left| Kaonar Sor.Kettarinchan ||NJKF || Tokyo, Japan || TKO || 5 ||
|-  bgcolor="#cfc"
| 1996-12-08|| Win|| align=left| Kyoji Katsuyama || Power Nine gym || Gotō Islands, Japan || Decision (Unanimous) || 5 || 3:00
|-  bgcolor="#cfc"
| 1996-10-06|| Win|| align=left| Naohiro Saito || NJKF 1st event '96 Japan Cup 6 weight Title Match || Tokyo, Japan || KO || 1 || 1:10 
|-
! style=background:white colspan=9 |
|-  bgcolor="#cfc"
| 1996-04-29|| Win|| align=left| Takeshi Imai || AJKF || Tokyo, Japan || TKO || 4 ||
|-  bgcolor="#fbb"
| 1995-09-29|| Loss || align=left| Choi ||AJKF || Tokyo, Japan || KO || 1 ||
|-  bgcolor="#c5d2ea"
| 1995-07-02|| Draw || align=left| Choi ||AJKF || Tokyo, Japan || Decision || 3 || 3:00
|-  bgcolor="#fbb"
| 1995-03-23|| Loss|| align=left| Surasak Sor.Sentorn || Rajadamnern Stadium || Bangkok, Thailand || TKO || 3 ||
|-  bgcolor="#fbb"
| 1995-01-07|| Loss|| align=left| Yasuhiro Uchida|| AJKF || Tokyo, Japan || KO || 3 ||
|-  bgcolor="#cfc"
| 1994-10-30|| Win|| align=left| Kenichi Sugita || AJKF || Tokyo, Japan || KO || 3 ||
|-  bgcolor="#cfc"
| 1994-06-17|| Win|| align=left| Aou Hayashi || AJKF || Tokyo, Japan || KO || 1 ||
|-  bgcolor="#cfc"
| 1994-04-23|| Win|| align=left| Takayuki Miyamoto || AJKF || Tokyo, Japan || Decision (Unanimous) || 3 || 3:00
|-  bgcolor="#cfc"
| 1994-03-26|| Win|| align=left| Koji Kabuto || AJKF || Tokyo, Japan || Decision (Majority) || 3 || 3:00
|-  bgcolor="#cfc"
| 1994-02-28|| Win|| align=left| Parksaknoi Chorchuchit ||  || Tokyo, Japan || Decision (Unanimous) || 5 || 3:00
|-  bgcolor="#fbb"
| 1993|| Loss|| align=left|  || || London || Decision ||  ||
|-  bgcolor="#fbb"
| 1993-06-20|| Loss|| align=left| Takaya Sato || AJKF || Tokyo, Japan || KO || 2 ||
|-  bgcolor="#cfc"
| 1992-12-19|| Win|| align=left| Yuko Miyamoto || AJKF One Truth 9th || Tokyo, Japan || KO  || 2 || 1:06
|-  bgcolor="#fbb"
| 1992-05-30|| Loss|| align=left| Yasuhiro Uchida || AJKF One Truth 3rd || Tokyo, Japan || Decision (Unanimous)  || 3 || 3:00
|-  bgcolor="#cfc"
| 1991-11-17|| Win|| align=left| Kim Sang Ho ||  || South Korea || KO || 2 ||
|-  bgcolor="#cfc"
| 1991-10-26|| Win|| align=left| Morimichi Nakajima || AJKF SOAR INTO THE SPACE Chapter VI || Tokyo, Japan || Decision (Unanimous)  || 3 || 3:00
|-  bgcolor="#fbb"
| 1989-06-10|| Loss|| align=left| Hiroyuki Endo || Japan Kickboxing Federation || Tokyo, Japan || KO  || 1 || 1:29
|-  bgcolor="#fbb"
| 1988-05-14|| Loss|| align=left| Shusaku Endo || Japan Kickboxing Federation || Tokyo, Japan || KO  || 1 || 1:14
|-  bgcolor="#cfc"
| 1987-02-13|| Win|| align=left| Mitsuhiro Takagi || Japan Kickboxing Federation || Tokyo, Japan || KO  || 1 || 1:04
|-
| colspan=9 | Legend:

References

Living people
1972 births
People from Nagano (city)
Japanese male kickboxers